Marica Perišić (born 25 January 2000) is a Serbian judoka. She won the gold medal at the 2020 European Junior Championships in women's lightweight 57 kg event.

She competed at the 2020 Summer Olympics in women's 57 kg event and was eliminated in the second round.

She won the gold medal in the women's 57 kg event at the 2022 Mediterranean Games held in Oran, Algeria.

Achievements

References

External links
 
 

2000 births
Living people
Serbian female judoka
European Games competitors for Serbia
Judoka at the 2019 European Games
Judoka at the 2020 Summer Olympics
Olympic judoka of Serbia
People from Temerin
Competitors at the 2018 Mediterranean Games
Competitors at the 2022 Mediterranean Games
Mediterranean Games gold medalists for Serbia
Mediterranean Games medalists in judo
21st-century Serbian women